Homayun Kosh (also Romanized as Homāyūn Kosh) is a village in Fash Rural District, in the Central District of Kangavar County, Kermanshah Province, Iran. At the 2006 census, its population was 17, in 4 families.

References 

Populated places in Kangavar County